Kris Wilson may refer to:
Kris Wilson (baseball) (born 1976), baseball pitcher
Kris Wilson (American football) (born 1981), American football player
Kris Wilson (cartoonist), cartoonist from Explosm
Kris Wilson (DJ), personality on ABC Radio Networks Real Country

See also
Chris Wilson (disambiguation)